The Ambassador Extraordinary and Plenipotentiary of the Russian Federation to the Republic of Burundi is the official representative of the President and the Government of the Russian Federation to the President and the Government of Burundi.

The Russian ambassador to Burundi and his staff work at large in the Embassy of Russia in Bujumbura.

History of diplomatic relations
Diplomatic relations between the Soviet Union and Burundi were established on 1 October 1962. The Soviet Union was initially represented through its embassy in Léopoldville, in the Democratic Republic of the Congo, with the ambassador to the Democratic Republic of the Congo holding dual accreditation to Burundi. The embassy in Bujumbura opened in 1964 with  appointed ambassador later that year. With the dissolution of the Soviet Union in 1991 the incumbent Soviet ambassador continued as representative of the Russian Federation until 1995.

List of representatives (1963 – present)

Representatives of the Soviet Union to Burundi (1963 – 1991)

Representatives of the Russian Federation to Burundi (1991 – present)

References

 
Burundi
Russia